Alexander Learmonth may refer to:
 Alexander Learmonth (politician) (1829–1887), British Army officer and politician
 Alexander Learmonth (baritone), English baritone